The third USS Dale (DD-290) was a  in the United States Navy. She was named for Richard Dale.

Service history

United States Navy
Dale was launched 19 November 1919 by Bethlehem Shipbuilding Corporation, Squantum, Massachusetts; sponsored by Mrs. A. J. Peters; and commissioned 16 February 1920.

From 3 March to 3 April 1920 Dale patrolled New England waters aiding in the recalibration of radio compass stations in the 1st Naval District. Assigned to Destroyer Force, U.S. Atlantic Fleet, she operated with destroyer squadrons along the Atlantic coast, in the Gulf of Mexico, and in the Caribbean Sea. Her activities included tactical exercises and battle practice; fleet maneuvers, war exercises, and fleet search problems; training naval reservists; and service from Norfolk, Virginia in the calibration of radio compass stations in the 5th Naval District.

On 17 June 1924 Dale sailed from Newport, Rhode Island under the command of William F. Halsey, Jr. to make courtesy visits to ports in Germany, Denmark, Norway, Scotland, England, France, Spain, and Portugal. Arriving at Gibraltar on 21 September, she cruised in the Mediterranean Sea until June, engaging in battle practice, intelligence work, and international goodwill calls. She departed Gibraltar on 2 July 1925 for New York City, arriving on 16 July.

Dale operated with Destroyer Squadrons, Scouting Fleet, on the United States East Coast, in the Caribbean, and in the Panama Canal Zone until arrival at Philadelphia, on 21 September 1929. She was decommissioned there on 1 May 1930 and sold on 17 January 1931.

Commercial banana boat
The destroyer equipped with a new propulsion plant, converted to a banana carrier and renamed MV Masaya operating for the Standard Fruit and Steamship Co., of New Orleans, Louisiana from 1933.

United States Army and fate
With the Philippines cut off by Japanese forces the War Department attempted to use blockade runners. Some were to make the attempt from Australia or Java, but some were to make the attempt directly from the United States. One recommendation, carried directly to the President of the United States, was the acquisition by bareboat charter and use of three World War I destroyers that had been converted to fast banana carriers, one immediately available in New Orleans. Cargos for two other vessels, then in the Caribbean, were to be sent to await their availability in New Orleans. Delays occurred, but Masaya departed New Orleans on 2 March 1942 with Matagalpa following on 11 March and Teapa on 18 March. All were delayed for repairs in Los Angeles with reloading for Corregidor. They reached Hawaii too late to relieve Corregidor. The ship was instead sent to the Southwest Pacific Area, entering the Southwest Pacific Area command's permanent local fleet on 12 March 1942, where in an effort to support operations in Buna she was bombed and sunk five miles to the east of Oro Bay, New Guinea on 28 March 1943. Casualties were 10 killed + 1 DOW/4 wounded

References

Bibliography

External links
USS DALE (DD-290) NavSource
The Saga of S.S. Masaya. Don Fetterly.

 

Clemson-class destroyers
Destroyers sunk by aircraft
Ships built in Quincy, Massachusetts
1919 ships
World War II shipwrecks in the Pacific Ocean
Maritime incidents in March 1943
Ships sunk by Japanese aircraft
Dole plc